Joseph V. Melillo was executive producer at the Brooklyn Academy of Music (BAM) from 1999 to 2018, and was named executive producer emeritus upon his departure. He is Columbia Artists' International Artistic Advisor, and was a 2019 Director’s Fellow at the Center for Ballet and the Arts at New York University.

Education 
Joseph V. Melillo earned a Bachelor of Arts degree in English and theater at Sacred Heart University in Fairfield, CT and a Masters of Fine Arts in speech and drama at Catholic University of America in Washington, DC.

Career 
Melillo was responsible for the artistic direction of theater, dance, music, visual art, film, and more at the multi-venue arts center, which includes the Harvey Theater, Howard Gilman Opera House, Fishman Space, Rose Cinemas, and BAMcafé. Prior to that, working with President/Executive Producer Harvey Lichtenstein, Melillo served as BAM's producing director, following a six-year tenure as founding director of the BAM Next Wave Festival.

Over 35 years at BAM, Melillo programmed the work of emerging and established artists such as Pina Bausch, Philip Glass, Trisha Brown, Bill T. Jones/Arnie Zane, Merce Cunningham, Robert Wilson, Urban Bush Women, Ivo van Hove, Ralph Lemon, Anne Bogart, Cheek by Jowl, Reggie Wilson, Mark Morris, and Michelle Dorrance, among many others. During his tenure, he worked alongside Karen Brooks Hopkins (BAM president from 1999—2015) and Katy Clark (BAM president from 2015—present).

He forged artistic partnerships such as The Bridge Project—a three-year series of international theater engagements featuring a trans-Atlantic company of actors directed by Sam Mendes and produced by BAM, The Old Vic, and Neal Street—and for seven seasons, DanceMotion USAsm, an international cultural diplomacy program in partnership with the US Department of State. In 1999, the BAM Rose Cinemas opened with four screens, including one dedicated to repertory and special series.

Under Melillo's guidance, in 2012—a year after celebrating 150 years—BAM expanded to include the Richard B. Fisher Building. It features the smaller, flexible Fishman Space, a third stage for BAM's programs, as well as the Education department and children's programming. The history of Melillo's programming at BAM is documented in two books: BAM: The Complete Works (2011) and BAM: The Next Wave Festival (2018). BAM's extensive archive is digitized and publicly accessible through the Leon Levy Digital Archive.

Recognition 
 Chevalier (1999) and Officier (2004) de L’ordre des Arts et des Lettres, France
OBIE Award for International Programming (2002—3)
Drama Desk Special Award for bringing works of distinction from around the world (2002—3)
 Honorary OBE for outstanding commitment to British performing arts in the US (2004)
 Knight of the Royal Order of the Polar Star for solidifying ties in performing arts between Sweden and the US (2007)
 Cultural ambassador for Taiwan for bringing the arts of Taiwan to US (2012)
 Honorary Doctorate of Humane Letters, St. Francis College, Brooklyn, NY (2012)
 Gaudium Award, Breukelein Institute (2012)
National Medal of the Arts (2013), received by Joseph V. Melillo and Karen B. Hopkins on behalf of BAM
 Knight of the National Order of Québec (2016)
Bessie Awards, Presenter Award for Outstanding Curating (2018)
Aga Khan Music Initiative, advisor (2018—19)
Medal of Commander of the Ordre des Arts et des Lettres, France (2019)
International Citation of Merit, International Society for the Performing Arts (2020)

Teaching and adjudication 
Melillo has served as an adjudicator/panelist for award-giving and honorary bodies including the Praemium Imperiale, Japan Art Association; Wexner Prize, Wexner Center for the Arts; Pew Fellowship in the Arts; and the Rolex Mentor and Protégé Arts Initiative. He has been on boards of directors (Association of Performing Arts Presenters; En Garde Arts); and has taught and lectured (Brooklyn College Graduate Program in Arts Management), among numerous others.

References

External links
 https://www.crainsnewyork.com/article/20090120/FREE/901199966/bam-launching-300m-capital-campaign
 https://www.nydailynews.com/new-york/brooklyn/bam-stage-melillo-celebrates-25-years-helm-brooklyn-academy-music-article-1.381904
 https://www.americantheatre.org/2017/05/04/joseph-v-melillo-to-depart-brooklyn-academy-of-music/
 https://www.nyu.edu/about/news-publications/news/2018/august/the-center-for-ballet-and-the-arts-launches-director-s-fellowshi.html
 https://howlround.com/how-have-successful-thirty-five-year-career

Year of birth missing (living people)
Living people
Officiers of the Ordre des Arts et des Lettres
Bessie Award winners
Knights of the National Order of Quebec